This is a list of active and extinct volcanoes in Pakistan. Most of these are mud volcanoes, rather than the conventional magmatic type.

References

External links
 Makran Mud Volcanoes
 The Volcanoes of Pakistan
 Active mud volcanoes on- and offshore eastern Makran, Pakistan
 The mud volcanoes of Pakistan

Volcanoes
Volcanoes of Pakistan
Pakistan
Volcanoes